Agnès Gosselin (born 21 November 1967) is a French former figure skater who competed in ladies' singles. She is a six-time French national champion (1983 to 1988) and competed at two Winter Olympics, in 1984 and 1988.

Results

References
 

1967 births
Olympic figure skaters of France
Figure skaters at the 1984 Winter Olympics
Figure skaters at the 1988 Winter Olympics
French female single skaters
Living people
Sportspeople from Caen